Prosoponoides is a genus of Asian sheet weavers that was first described by Alfred Frank Millidge & A. Russell-Smith in 1992.

Species
 it contains nineteen species, found in Asia:
Prosoponoides bangbieense Irfan, Zhang & Peng, 2022 – China
Prosoponoides corneum Irfan, Zhang & Peng, 2022 – China
Prosoponoides dongshaofangense Irfan, Zhang & Peng, 2022 – China
Prosoponoides guanduense Irfan, Zhang & Peng, 2022 – China
Prosoponoides hamatum Millidge & Russell-Smith, 1992 (type) – China, Indonesia (Sumatra)
Prosoponoides idukkiense Domichan & Sunil Jose, 2022 – India
Prosoponoides jambi Tanasevitch, 2017 – Indonesia (Sumatra)
Prosoponoides kaharianum Millidge & Russell-Smith, 1992 – Indonesia (Borneo, Java)
Prosoponoides longiprojectum Irfan, Zhang & Peng, 2022 – China
Prosoponoides longyangense Irfan, Zhang & Peng, 2022 – China
Prosoponoides minutum Irfan, Zhang & Peng, 2022 – China
Prosoponoides pianmaense Irfan, Zhang & Peng, 2022 – China
Prosoponoides simile Millidge & Russell-Smith, 1992 – Thailand
Prosoponoides sinense (Chen, 1991) – China, Vietnam, Malaysia (peninsula)
Prosoponoides yakouense Irfan, Zhang & Peng, 2022 – China
Prosoponoides yani Irfan, Zhang & Peng, 2022 – China
Prosoponoides yapingense Irfan, Zhang & Peng, 2022 – China
Prosoponoides youyiense Liu & J. Chen, 2020 – China
Prosoponoides yunnanense Irfan, Zhang & Peng, 2022 – China

See also
 List of Linyphiidae species (I–P)

References

Araneomorphae genera
Linyphiidae
Spiders of Asia